Corse-du-Sud (or) is (as of 2019) an administrative department of France, consisting of the southern part of the island of Corsica. The corresponding departmental territorial collectivity merged with that of Haute-Corse on 1 January 2018, forming the single territorial collectivity of Corsica, with territorial elections coinciding with the dissolution of the separate council. Although its administrative powers were ceded to the new territorial collectivity, it continues to remain an administrative department in its own right. In 2019, it had a population of 158,507.

History

The department was formed on 1 January 1976, when the single department of Corsica was divided into Haute-Corse and Corse-du-Sud. Its boundaries corresponded to the former department of Liamone, which existed from 1793 to 1811.

On 6 February 1998, Corse-du-Sud's prefect Claude Érignac was assassinated in Ajaccio. The Corsican nationalist Yvan Colonna was eventually convicted of the crime.

On 6 July 2003 a referendum rejected increased autonomy by a small majority, with 50.98 percent voting against and 49.02 percent for. This was a major setback for the French Minister of the Interior, Nicolas Sarkozy, who had hoped to use Corsica as the first step in his decentralization programme.

On 1 January 2018, Corse-du-Sud's administrative powers were partly ceded to the new territorial collectivity of Corsica.

Geography 
The department is surrounded on three sides by the Mediterranean Sea and on the north by the department of Haute-Corse. The entire island of Corsica is mountainous with many beautiful beaches.

Principal towns

The most populous commune is Ajaccio, the prefecture. As of 2019, there are 3 communes with more than 4,000 inhabitants:

Demographics 

The people living in Corse-du-Sud are called Suttanacci.
According to an INSEE study, in the period 2020-2021 9.1% of the population were immigrants and 11.3% were descendants of immigrants (at least one parent).

Politics

The current prefect of Corse-du-Sud (and also prefect of the collectivity of Corsica) is Amaury de Saint-Quentin, who took office on 7 March 2022.

Current National Assembly representatives

Tourism 
The former department enjoys the mild and hot climate of Mediterranean Islands, and therefore attracts a lot of tourists. Its perhaps largest tourist attraction is the city of Bonifacio, part of which is built upon a huge cliff.
But inside mountains are beautiful as well, especially the Aiguilles de Bavella, some naked, needle-like rocks.

Notes

See also
 Cantons of the Corse-du-Sud department
 Communes of the Corse-du-Sud department
 Arrondissements of the Corse-du-Sud department
 List of historical monuments in South Corsica

References

External links
  Prefecture website
	
  

 
1976 establishments in France
Departments of Corsica
Corsica region articles needing translation from French Wikipedia
States and territories established in 1976